I Die for You Today is the 22nd single overall from Alphaville, and the first single from Alphaville's 2010 album Catching Rays on Giant. The original lyrics for the song were written by The Outsider, a long-time fan of the band, and published on the band's official mailing list in 2001. Marian Gold later reworked the lyrics for the song.

It was released on 22 August 2010.

Track listing
 CD Single
 "I Die for You Today" – 3:47
 "I Die for You Today (Acoustic Version) – 3:34

 Digital Download
 "I Die for You Today" – 3:47
 "I Die for You Today (Acoustic Version) – 3:34

Chart performance
The single hit #15 in Germany and #64 in Austria, and represents Alphaville's first chart-performing single since 1994's "Fools".

References

2010 singles
Alphaville (band) songs
Songs written by Marian Gold
2010 songs